The Ultimate Collection or Ultimate Collection are names given to a number of compilation music albums:

 The Ultimate Collection (ABC album), 2004
 The Ultimate Collection (Ace of Base album), 2005
 The Ultimate Collection (Oleta Adams album), 2004
 The Ultimate Collection (Aerodrom album), 2008
 The Ultimate Collection (Black Sabbath album), 2016
 The Ultimate Collection (The Brian Setzer Orchestra album), 2004
 The Ultimate Collection (Bryan Ferry and Roxy Music album), 1988
 The Ultimate Collection (Chris de Burgh album), 2000
 The Ultimate Collection (The Carpenters album), 2006
 The Ultimate Collection (1998 Patsy Cline album)
 The Ultimate Collection (2000 Patsy Cline album)
 The Ultimate Collection (Earth, Wind & Fire album), 1999
 The Ultimate Collection (Electric Light Orchestra album), 2001
 The Ultimate Collection (Električni Orgazam album), 2009
 The Ultimate Collection (Emerson, Lake & Palmer album), 2004
 The Ultimate Collection (Four Tops album), 1997
 The Ultimate Collection (Garth Brooks album), 2016
 The Ultimate Collection (Renée Geyer album), 2010
 The Ultimate Collection (Gladys Knight and The Pips album), 1997
 The Ultimate Collection (John Lee Hooker album), 1991
 The Ultimate Collection (Whitney Houston album), 2007
 The Ultimate Collection (Katherine Jenkins album), 2009
 The Ultimate Collection (Billy Joel album), 2000
 The Ultimate Collection (Michael Jackson album), 2004
 The Ultimate Collection (Grace Jones album), 2006
 The Ultimate Collection (Jump5 album), 2009
 The Ultimate Collection (B.B. King album), 2005
 The Ultimate Collection (The Kinks album), 2002
 The Ultimate Collection, by Ladysmith Black Mambazo, 2001
 The Ultimate Collection (Madonna), 2000
 The Ultimate Collection (Richard Marx album), 2016
 The Ultimate Collection (Johnny Mathis album), 2011
 The Ultimate Collection by Michael McDonald, 2005
 The Ultimate Collection (The Miracles album), 1998
 The Ultimate Collection (MxPx album), 2008
 The Ultimate Collection (Newsboys album), 2009
 The Ultimate Collection (The O.C. Supertones album), 2008
 The Ultimate Collection (Chihiro Onitsuka album), 2004
 The Ultimate Collection (Osibisa album), 1997
 The Ultimate Collection (Luciano Pavarotti album), 2007
 The Ultimate Collection (Poco album), 1998
 The Ultimate Collection (Rebecca St. James album), 2008
 The Ultimate Collection (Sade album), 2011
 The Ultimate Collection (Santana album), 1997
 The Ultimate Collection (The Seekers album), 2003
 The Ultimate Collection (Paul Simon album), 2015
 The Ultimate Collection (Solution album), 2005
 The Ultimate Collection (Steps album), 2011
 The Ultimate Collection (Barbra Streisand album), 2002
 The Ultimate Collection (2010 Barbra Streisand album)
 The Ultimate Collection (2003 Donna Summer album)
 The Ultimate Collection (2016 Donna Summer album)
 The Ultimate Collection (The Supremes album), 1997
 The Ultimate Collection (The Temptations album), 1997
 The Ultimate Collection, by Bonnie Tyler, 1995
 The Ultimate Collection (Uriah Heep album), 2003
 The Ultimate Collection (Russell Watson album), 2006
 The Ultimate Collection (Barry White album), 2000
 The Ultimate Collection (The Who album), 2002
 "Weird Al" Yankovic: The Ultimate Collection, 1993
 The Ultimate Collection (YU Grupa album), 2009
 The Ultimate Collection (Zabranjeno pušenje album), 2009
 The Ultimate Collection (ZOEgirl album), 2009

 Ultimate Collection (Anastacia album), 2015
 Ultimate Collection (Rick Astley album), 2008
 Ultimate Collection (Buju Banton album), 2001
 Ultimate Collection (Pat Benatar album), 2008
 Ultimate Collection (Black 'n Blue album), 2001
 Ultimate Collection (Joe Cocker album), 2004
 Ultimate Collection (DeBarge album), 1997
 Ultimate Collection (Dennis DeYoung album), 1999
 Ultimate Collection (El DeBarge album), 2003
 Ultimate Collection (Eurythmics album), 2005
 Ultimate Collection (The Fixx album), 1999
 Ultimate Collection (Johnny Gill album), 2002
 Ultimate Collection (Keith Green DVD), 2002
 Ultimate Collection (M People album), 2005
 Ultimate Collection: The Remixes, 2005
 Ultimate Collection (Aimee Mann album), 2000
 Ultimate Collection (Don Moen album), 2013
 Ultimate Collection (No Angels album), 2003
 Ultimate Collection (Matt Redman album), 2010
 Ultimate Collection (Shanice album), 1999